Daniel Hwang (12 March 1953 – 17 October 2022) was a Taiwanese politician. A member of the Kuomintang and the People First Party, he served in the Legislative Yuan from 1999 to 2012.

Hwang died after a fall in his home in Taipei, on 17 October 2022, at the age of 69.

References

1953 births 
2022 deaths
Kuomintang Members of the Legislative Yuan in Taiwan
People First Party Members of the Legislative Yuan
Taichung Members of the Legislative Yuan
Members of the 4th Legislative Yuan
Members of the 5th Legislative Yuan
Members of the 6th Legislative Yuan
Members of the 7th Legislative Yuan
Tamkang University alumni
Chinese Culture University alumni
People from Yunlin County